"Live It Up, Pt. 1 & 2" is a funk/rock song released by the Isley Brothers, on their album of the same name in 1974 on their T-Neck imprint.

Overview
The song attacked conformity and advocated control, and it was much like some of the group's "Do What You Wanna Do" records of the time. This song's free-love message helped it become an R&B smash upon its release.   Ronald's gritty vocals are helped by his brothers' rambunctious and testosterone-driven background vocals. The song also features a screaming guitar solo from Ernie, and Chris closes it with a clavinet solo.

Part one is the vocal version, featuring lead singer Ronald and his accompanying backup singing brothers Rudolph and O'Kelly. Part two is the instrumental version.

This song was included on the album Live It Up, which was a popular recording upon its release in 1974. Like many of the songs on the album, the title song was one of the most overlooked hit recordings by the brothers.

Personnel
Instrumental credits based on original album Liner notesMusic Programming & Vocal credits based on Liner notes for the 1999 Greatest Hits album It's Your Thing
Isley Brothers
Ronald Isley: lead and background vocals 
O'Kelly Isley Jr. and Rudolph Isley: background vocals 
Ernie Isley: electric guitar, drums, background vocals 
Marvin Isley: bass guitar, background vocals
Chris Jasper: electric piano, ARP synthesizers, clavinet, background vocals

Additional Musicians 
Malcolm Cecil: synthesizer programming 
Robert Margouleff: synthesizer programming

Chart performance
"Live It Up" peaked at number four on the Hot Soul Singles chart and reached number fifty-two on the Hot 100 chart.

References

1974 singles
The Isley Brothers songs
1974 songs
Songs written by Ernie Isley
Songs written by Marvin Isley
Songs written by O'Kelly Isley Jr.
Songs written by Ronald Isley
Songs written by Rudolph Isley
Songs written by Chris Jasper
T-Neck Records singles